CJ7: The Cartoon, also known as CJ7, Love the Earth, is a 2010 Hong Kong–Chinese animated science fiction comedy film and a retelling of the 2008 film CJ7. It was produced by Stephen Chow, the star/director/producer/writer of CJ7 and directed by Toe Yuen, the director of animation films such as My Life as McDull and McDull, Prince de la Bun.

Cast
 Xu Jiao as Dicky Chow
 Stephen Chow as Chow Ti
 Shi Renmao as Chow Ti
 Shi Banyu as Chow Ti
 Kitty Zhang Yuqi as Miss Yuen
 Dong Jie as Miss Yuen
 Wu Gang as Johnny's dad
 Lei Huang as Johnny
 Fung Min Hang as PE Teacher

References

External links
 
 

2010 animated films
2010 films
2010s Cantonese-language films
2010s children's comedy films
Chinese children's films
Hong Kong animated films
2010 comedy films
Hong Kong science fiction films
2010s Mandarin-language films
2010s Hong Kong films